The 2007–08 Turkish Ice Hockey Super League season was the 16th season of the Turkish Ice Hockey Super League, the top level of ice hockey in Turkey. Seven teams participated in the league.

Regular season

Playoffs

Semifinals
 Kocaeli Büyükşehir Belediyesi Kağıt Spor Kulübü - TED Ankara Koleji SK 18:4
 Polis Akademisi ve Koleji - Başkent Yıldızları Spor Kulübü 6:2

3rd place 
 TED Ankara Koleji SK - Başkent Yıldızları Spor Kulübü 9:10

Final
 Kocaeli Büyükşehir Belediyesi Kağıt Spor Kulübü - Polis Akademisi ve Koleji 1:4

External links
 Season on hockeyarchives.info

TBHSL
Turkish Ice Hockey Super League seasons
TBSHL